Rising with the Sun is the seventh studio album by Melbourne band The Cat Empire. It was produced by Jan Skubiszewski and released on 4 March 2016 through Two Shoes Records. The first single was "Qué Será Ahora", followed by "Wolves" and "Bulls". "Wolves" placed at number 79 in the Triple J Hottest 100, 2015. It debuted at number one on the Australian ARIA Albums Chart, the band's second number-one debut, the first being Two Shoes (2005).

Reception
Rolling Stone Australia awarded the album four out of five stars, saying that Rising with the Sun was a "remarkably intercontinental affair." The magazine praised the new album, calling it "an ebullient celebration sans frontiers." Double J was also positive in its review, writing "The Cat Empire administer another dose of fun, diverse music on album number seven."

Track listing

Personnel 

The Cat Empire core members
 Harry James Angus – vocals, trumpet
 Will Hull-Brown – drums, percussion
 Jamshid Khadiwhala – turntables, percussion
 Ollie McGill – piano, organ, backing vocals
 Ryan Monro – bass guitar
 Felix Riebl – lead vocals, percussion

The Empire Horns (auxiliary members)
 Kieran Conrau – trombone, backing vocals
 Ross Irwin – trumpet, backing vocals
Additional musicians
 Emily Lubitz – backing vocals (track 3)

Recording details
 Produced by – Jan Skubiszewski
 Mixing – Jan Skubiszewski
 Engineering – Jan Skubiszewski
 Mastered by – Joe La Porta
 Studio – Way of the Eagle Studios (engineering, mixing); Sterling Sound (mastering)

Charts

Weekly charts

Year-end charts

References

2016 albums
The Cat Empire albums